Karl Zwack was an Austrian pair skater. With partner Idi Papez, he was the 1933 European Champion and was a three-time World medalist

Results
with Idi Papez

References

Navigation

Austrian male pair skaters
World Figure Skating Championships medalists
European Figure Skating Championships medalists